Following his "Indian Summer" in 1895, W.G. Grace continued to play first-class cricket through his fiftieth birthday in 1898 and finally severed his connections with both Gloucestershire and England in 1899.

Background

An oft-repeated story about Grace is that, in 1896, the Australian pace bowler Ernie Jones bowled a short-pitched delivery so close to his face that it appeared to go through the famous beard which made him so instantly recognisable.  Grace reportedly reacted by demanding of Australian captain Harry Trott: "Here, what's all this?" Trott said to Jones: "Steady, Jonah".  To which Jones laconically replied: "Sorry, doctor, she slipped".  There are multiple variations of the story and, although some sources have recorded that the incident happened in a Test match, there is little doubt that the game in question was the tour opener at Sheffield Park.  This is separately confirmed by C.B. Fry and Stanley Jackson who were both playing in the match, Jackson batting with Grace at the time.

Grace made 30 first-class appearances in 1896, scoring 2,135 runs, with a highest score of 301, at an average of 42.70 with 4 centuries and 11 half-centuries. In the field, he took 18 catches and 52 wickets with a best analysis of 7–59. His bowling average was 24.01; he had 5 wickets in an innings 3 times and 10 wickets in a match once.

Grace made 25 first-class appearances in 1897, scoring 1,532 runs, with a highest score of 131, at an average of 39.28 with 4 centuries and 7 half-centuries. In the field, he took 15 catches and 56 wickets with a best analysis of 6–36. His bowling average was 22.17; he had 5 wickets in an innings 4 times.

By the time of his fiftieth birthday in July 1898, Grace had developed a somewhat corpulent figure and had lost his former agility, which meant he was no longer a capable fielder.  He remained a very good batsman and at need a useful slow bowler, but he was clearly entering the twilight of his career and was now generally referred to as "The Old Man".  As a special occasion, the MCC committee arranged the 1898 Gentlemen v Players match to coincide with his fiftieth birthday and he celebrated the event by scoring 43 and 31 not out, though handicapped by lameness and an injured hand.

Grace made 26 first-class appearances in 1898, scoring 1,513 runs, with a highest score of 168, at an average of 42.02 with 3 centuries and 8 half-centuries. In the field, he took 20 catches and 36 wickets with a best analysis of 7–44. His bowling average was 25.41; he had 5 wickets in an innings 3 times and 10 wickets in a match once.

Grace had received an invitation from the Crystal Palace Company in London to help them form the London County Cricket Club.  Grace accepted the offer and became the club's secretary, manager and captain with an annual salary of £600.  As a result, he severed his connection with Gloucestershire during the 1899 season.

Grace captained England in the First Test of the 1899 series against Australia at Trent Bridge, when he was 51.  By this time his bulk had made him a liability in the field and, afterwards, realising his limitations all too clearly, he decided to stand down and surrendered both his place and the captaincy to Archie MacLaren.  It is evident that Grace "plotted" his own omission from the England team by asking C.B. Fry, another selector who had arrived late for their meeting, if he thought that MacLaren should play in the Second Test.  Fry answered: "Yes, I do." "That settles it", said Grace, and he promptly retired from international cricket.  Explaining his decision later, Grace ruefully admitted of his diminished fielding skills that "the ground was getting a bit too far away".

Grace last played at Lord's for the Gentlemen in 1899 though he continued to represent the team at other venues until 1906.

Grace made 13 first-class appearances in 1899, scoring 515 runs, with a highest score of 78, at an average of 23.40 with 0 centuries and 3 half-centuries. In the field, he took 7 catches and 20 wickets with a best analysis of 5–86. His bowling average was 24.10; he had 5 wickets in an innings once.

Footnote

• a) As described in Grace's first-class career statistics, there are different versions of Grace's first-class career totals as a result of disagreement among cricket statisticians re the status of some matches he played in.  Note that this is a statistical issue only and has little, if any, bearing on the historical aspects of Grace's career. In the infobox, the "traditional" first-class figures from Wisden 1916 (as reproduced by Rae, pp. 495–496), are given first and the "amended" figures from CricketArchive follow in parentheses. There is no dispute about Grace's Test career record and those statistics are universally recognised. See Variations in first-class cricket statistics for more information.

References

External links
 CricketArchive – WG Grace

Bibliography

 
 
 
 
 
 
 
 
 

English cricket seasons in the 19th century
1896